Son of Dungeon Tape is a cassette tape by Australian folk rock group The Triffids.  This tape was only sold at the Triffids’ performances in early  1988. The tape was not simply a re-issue of the original Dungeon Tape with only five of the original tracks making it on to this compilation tape.

In 2010 the group issued a compilation box set, Come Ride with Me... Wide Open Road – The Deluxe Edition of 10× CDs with Disc 5 subtitled Grandson of Dungeon Tape which provides a selection from Dungeon Tape and Son of Dungeon Tape.

Track listing

Side A
 "Red Pony"
 "Play Thing"
 "My Baby Thinks She's a Train"
 "M.G.M."
 "Too Hot To Move, Too Hot to Think"
 "Nothing Good Is Going to Come of This"
 "Family Name"
 "Madeline"

Side B
 "Twisted Brain"
 "I Can't Wait to See Your Gun"
 "Hours at a Time"
 "Man Who Can"
 "Son of Reverie
 "Son of Stand Up"
 "Branded"
 "Nothing Can Take Your Place"

References 

1988 albums
The Triffids albums